Tove Nielsen (born 1941) is a Danish teacher who served as the minister of education in the cabinet led by Poul Hartling between 1973 and 1975. She was also a member of the Danish Parliament and European Parliament.

Biography
Nielsen was born in Durup, Salling, on 8 April 1941. She obtained a teaching degree in 1964 and worked as a teacher until 1973. She was appointed minister of education to the cabinet of Prime Minister Poul Hartling on 19 December 1973. She replaced Ritt Bjerregaard in the post. Nielsen was in office until 13 February 1975 and was replaced by Ritt Bjerregaard in the post.

Nielsen served in the Danish parliament as part of Venstre for three terms: 1972–1973, 1975–1977 and 1979–1980. She resigned from the parliament in 1980. Then she served in the European Parliament between 1979 and 1994.

References

20th-century Danish women politicians
1941 births
Education ministers of Denmark
Living people
Members of the Folketing 1975–1977
Venstre (Denmark) politicians
Women government ministers of Denmark
Members of the Folketing 1979–1981
Women members of the Folketing
MEPs for Denmark 1979–1984
MEPs for Denmark 1984–1989
MEPs for Denmark 1989–1994